Vergeer is a surname. Notable people with the surname include:

Esther Vergeer (born 1981), Dutch wheelchair tennis player
Hein Vergeer (born 1961), Dutch speed skater